Red 13 is the first EP and to date the only EP by the rock band Journey.

History
The EP was the first released on the band's own label, Journey Music. Originally sold only via the band's website, the online edition featured cover art by Kelly McDonald.  When the album was packaged for retail sale, a new cover designed by artist and Journey fan Christopher Payne was chosen.

Red 13 is an experimental EP recorded by the band as a thank you to their fans for standing by Journey. The four songs range from a slight return to their progressive roots, a bluesy hard rocker, a cinematic ballad with a dark side and their trademark melodic rock. The band released this EP on to their website and, later, with cover art created by one of their fans (Christopher Payne), worldwide.

"Walkin' Away from the Edge", which was co-written with then-Queensrÿche frontman Geoff Tate (despite Tate not receiving a writing credit), was originally recorded by the band during the Arrival sessions, but ultimately not used.

Track listing

Personnel
Band members
 Steve Augeri – lead vocals
 Neal Schon – lead guitar, backing vocals
 Ross Valory – bass, backing vocals
 Deen Castronovo – drums, percussion, backing vocals
 Jonathan Cain – keyboards, rhythm guitar, backing vocals

Production
Engineer – Jonathan Cain
Mixing – Jonathan Cain, Neal Schon and Gary Cirimelli

References

External links
Red 13 Cover Artist
Heavy Harmonies page

Journey (band) albums
2002 EPs
Albums produced by Jonathan Cain